In enzymology, an aspartyltransferase is an enzyme that catalyzes the chemical reaction

L-asparagine + hydroxylamine  NH3 + L-aspartylhydroxamate

Thus, the two substrates of this enzyme are L-asparagine and hydroxylamine, whereas its two products are NH3 and L-aspartylhydroxamate.

This enzyme belongs to the family of transferases, specifically the aminoacyltransferases.  The systematic name of this enzyme class is L-asparagine:hydroxylamine gamma-aspartyltransferase. Other names in common use include beta-aspartyl transferase, and aspartotransferase.

References

 

EC 2.3.2
Enzymes of unknown structure